The Vaucluse Mountains (French: Monts de Vaucluse) are a mountain range of the French Prealps located in the departement of Vaucluse, between the Luberon Massif and Mont Ventoux.

Landforms of Vaucluse
Mountain ranges of Provence-Alpes-Côte d'Azur
Provence-Alpes-Côte d'Azur region articles needing translation from French Wikipedia